Disease Models & Mechanisms (DMM) is a monthly peer-reviewed Open Access biomedical journal published by The Company of Biologists that launched in 2008. DMM is partnered with Publons, is part of the Review Commons initiative and has two-way integration with bioRxiv.

Scope and content 
DMM publishes original research, resources and reviews that focus on the use of model systems to better understand, diagnose and treat human disease.

Model systems of interest include:

 Vertebrates such as mice, zebrafish, frogs, rats and other mammals

 Invertebrates such as Drosophila melanogaster and Caenorhabditis elegans
 Unique in vitro or ex vivo models, such as stem-cell-based models, organoids and systems based on patient material
 Microorganisms such as yeast and Dictyostelium
 Other biological systems with relevance to human disease research

Disease areas of interest include:

 Cancer
 Neurodegenerative and neurological diseases
 Psychiatric disorders
 Metabolic disorders, including diabetes and obesity
 Cardiovascular diseases, stroke and hypertension
 Gastrointestinal diseases
 Infectious diseases
 Autoimmunity and inflammation
 Developmental diseases
 Musculoskeletal disorders
 Renal or liver disease
 Eye disorders
 Drug and biomarker discovery/screening
 Stem cell therapies in regenerative medicine

The journal operates on a continuous publication model. The final version of record is immediately released online as soon as it is ready.

All papers are published as Open Access articles under the CC-BY licence.

Abstracting and indexing
The journal is abstracted and/or indexed by:

 BIOBASE
 CAB abstracts
 Cambridge Scientific Abstracts
 Clarivate Analytics Web of Science
 EMBASE
 Medline
 Scopus

It is a member of OASPA (Open Access Scholarly Publishers Association) and is indexed in the DOAJ (Directory of Open Access Journals).

Disease Models & Mechanisms is a signatory of the San Francisco Declaration on Research Assessment (DORA).

Management 
The founding editor-in-chief was Vivian Siegel (2008-2013), followed by Ross Cagan (2013-2016) and Monica J. Justice (2016-2020).

Elizabeth Patton was appointed Editor-in-Chief in December 2020, with Elaine Mardis as Deputy Editor-in-Chief.

References

External links

 The Company of Biologists

Pathology journals
Publications established in 2008
The Company of Biologists academic journals
Monthly journals